Myzia subvittata, the subvittate lady beetle, is a species of lady beetle in the family Coccinellidae.  It is found in North America.

References

Further reading

 
 
 
 

Coccinellidae
Beetles described in 1850